The Truman Capote Award for Literary Criticism is awarded for literary criticism by the University of Iowa on behalf of the Truman Capote Literary Trust.  The value of the award is $30,000 (USD), and is said to be the largest annual cash prize for literary criticism in the English language. The formal name of the prize is the Truman Capote Award for Literary Criticism in Memory of Newton Arvin, commemorating both Capote and his friend Newton Arvin, who was a distinguished critic and Smith College professor until he lost his job in 1960 after his homosexuality was publicly exposed.

Recipients
2022 Heather Clark - Red Comet: The Short Life and Blazing Art of Sylvia Plath
2021 Kay Ryan - Synthesizing Gravity: Selected Prose
2020 Fred Moten - Black and Blur
2019 Brent Hayes Edwards - Epistrophies: Jazz and the Literary Imagination
2018 Robert Hass - A Little Book on Form: An Exploration into the Formal Imagination of Poetry
2017 Gillian Beer - Alice in Space: The Sideways Victorian World of Lewis Carroll
2016 Kevin Birmingham - The Most Dangerous Book: The Battle for James Joyce’s Ulysses
2015 Stanley Plumly - The Immortal Evening: A Legendary Dinner With Keats, Wordsworth, and Lamb
2014 Fredric Jameson - The Antinomies of Realism
2013 Marina Warner - Stranger Magic: Charmed States and the Arabian Nights
2012 Elaine Showalter - A Jury of Her Peers: Celebrating American Women Writers from Anne Bradstreet to Annie Proulx
2011 Mark McGurl - The Program Era: Postwar Fiction and the Rise of Creative Writing
2010 Seth Lerer - Children’s Literature: A Reader’s History from Aesop to Harry Potter
2009 Geoffrey Hill - Collected Critical Writings
2008 Helen Small - The Long Life
2007 William H. Gass - A Temple of Texts
2006 Geoffrey Hartman and Daniel T. O'Hara - The Geoffrey Hartman Reader
2005 Angus Fletcher - A New Theory for American Poetry
2004 Susan Stewart - Poetry and the Fate of the Senses
2003 Seamus Heaney - Finders Keepers: Selected Prose, 1971-2001
2002 Declan Kiberd - Irish Classics
2001 Malcolm Bowie - Proust Among the Stars
2000 Elaine Scarry - Dreaming by the Book and Philip Fisher - Still the New World: American Literature in a Culture of Creative Destruction
1999 Charles Rosen - Romantic Poets, Critics, and Other Madmen
1998 John Kerrigan - Revenge Tragedy: Aeschylus to Armageddon
1997 John Felstiner - Paul Celan: Poet, Survivor, Jew
1996 Helen Vendler - The Given and the Made: Strategies of Poetic Redefinition

References

External links
 Recipients of the Truman Capote Award for Literary Criticism

Literary criticism
American literary awards
Awards established in 1996
Literary awards honoring lifetime achievement
1996 establishments in Iowa